Dendrobium mortii, commonly known as the slender pencil orchid, is a species of orchid that is endemic to eastern Australia. It is an epiphyte with hanging stems and leaves and flowering stems with up to three pale green to dark green flowers. The flowers have a white labellum with purple markings. It usually grows near the tops of rainforest trees that are often shrouded in mist.

Description
The side lobes are upright and the middle lobe curves downwards and has crinkly edges. Flowering occurs from September to November.

Taxonomy and naming
Dendrobium mortii was first formally described in 1859 by Ferdinand von Mueller and the description was published Fragmenta phytographiae Australiae from a specimen collected near the Hastings River by Hermann Beckler.

Distribution and habitat
The slender pencil orchid grows on the upper branches of rainforest trees, especially on ridge tops that are exposed to breezes and mists. It occurs between the McPherson Range in Queensland and Barrington Tops in New South Wales.

References

mortii
Endemic orchids of Australia
Orchids of New South Wales
Orchids of Queensland
Plants described in 1859
Taxa named by Ferdinand von Mueller